Tetrad Islands is a group of small islands lying southeast of Borge Point at Mikkelsen Harbor on Trinity Island in the Palmer Archipelago. They were shown on a 1952 Argentine government chart. The name given by the United Kingdom Antarctic Place-Names Committee (UK-APC) in 1960 is descriptive; there are four islands in the group.

See also 
 List of Antarctic and sub-Antarctic islands

References 

Islands of the Palmer Archipelago